Anglophone East School District is a Canadian school district in South-East New Brunswick. The district is an Anglophone district operating 39 public schools from grades Kindergarten to 12 in Albert and Westmorland counties. The name of the school district was changed from School District 2 in July 2012.

Enrollment for 2020-2021 is at approximately 16,145 students and 2,500 staff. Anglophone East School District is headquartered in Moncton.

See also
List of school districts in New Brunswick
List of schools in New Brunswick

References

 Official Website
 Schools in Anglophone East School District

School districts in New Brunswick
Anglophone